Franklin & Bash is an American legal comedy-drama series created by Kevin Falls and Bill Chais that originally aired on TNT. It stars Breckin Meyer as Jared Franklin, and Mark-Paul Gosselaar as Peter Bash, two unconventional lawyers and longtime friends that are recruited by the head of a firm to bring new life and perspective to the work place. Franklin & Bash premiered on June 1, 2011 and ended on October 22, 2014, with a total of 40 episodes over the course of four seasons.

Series overview

Episodes

Season 1 (2011)

Season 2 (2012)

Season 3 (2013)

Season 4 (2014)

References

External links

Lists of American comedy-drama television series episodes